Urgoo Cinema  (Palace Cinema) is a cinema in Ulaanbaatar, Mongolia, one of the main movie theaters in the country.

The cinema was first founded in 1987 by Mosproekt of the Soviet Union. After privatization, it was owned from 1998 to 2006 by New Tour Safaris, but declining audiences led to it closing. In 2007, renovation of the building and technology began under the recommendation of Warner Bros. International Cinema and with the investments of Urgoo Cinema Co. On 17 April 2009, the new cinema opened, and now shows U.S. and domestic films in five screens daily.

References

External links
Official WebSite 
Profile at Cinematreasures
Profile at Dayar (in Mongolian)

Entertainment companies of Mongolia
Cinemas in Mongolia
Buildings and structures in Ulaanbaatar